The 2002 Big Ten softball tournament was held at Alumni Field on the campus of the University of Michigan in Ann Arbor, Michigan.  As the tournament winner, Michigan earned the Big Ten Conference's automatic bid to the 2002 NCAA Division I softball tournament.

Format and seeding
The 2002 tournament was a six team double-elimination tournament. The top six teams based on conference regular season winning percentage earned invites to the tournament.

Tournament

References

Big Ten softball tournament
Tournament
Big Ten softball tournament